The Del-Lords are an American rock and roll band that formed in New York City, United States, in 1982, founded by The Dictators' guitarist Scott Kempner. The band combined elements of 1960s garage rock with country, blues and folk influences to become one of the early originators of urban, roots-rock. The band members were Scott Kempner, Manny Caiati, Eric Ambel and Frank Funaro.

History
Modeled on British bands of the 1960s that used several singers – The Kinks, Beatles, The Who - Kempner's vision was to create an act featuring four singers, that some said was like an "East Coast Beach Boys".

The band took its name from Del Lord, director of many early Three Stooges shorts. The four Del-Lords studio albums, released between 1984 and 1990 – Frontier Days, Johnny Comes Marching Home, Based on a True Story and Lovers Who Wander – were released on CD in 2008 by the American Beat label.

Twenty-six years after they began, The Del-Lords began work on new recordings.  They released their work in progress, Under Construction EP of rough mixes on their website on March 9, 2010. Their first four albums were re-released by Collector’s Choice-American Beat with bonus tracks and expanded liner notes.

In February 2010, The Del-Lords played their first live gigs in 20 years, starting with two unannounced gigs in the northeast US. They played a house concert in Rhode Island, and a sneak show at the Lakeside Lounge in New York before embarking on a seven city tour of Spain.

On May 14, 2013, Elvis Club, a new album, was released on the GB Music label.

Discography

Studio albums
Frontier Days (1984, EMI America)
Johnny Comes Marching Home (1986, EMI America)
Based on a True Story (1988, Enigma)
Lovers Who Wander (1990, Enigma)
Elvis Club (2013, GB Music)

EPs
Under Construction (2010)

Compilation albums
Get Tough: The Best of the Del-Lords (1999, Restless)

Live albums
Howlin' at the Halloween Moon (1989, Restless)

Singles
"Get Tough" / "Pledge of Love" (1985, EMI America)
"How Can a Poor Man Stand Such Times and Live" (1985, EMI America)
"Get Tough" (1986, EMI America)
"True Love" (1986, EMI America)
"Soldier's Home" (1986, EMI America)
"Heaven" (1986, EMI America)
"Cheyenne" (1989, Enigma)
"Poem of the River" (1989, Enigma)

References

External links
 

Musical groups from New York City
Musical groups established in 1982
Rock music groups from New York (state)
1982 establishments in New York City